Carville-la-Folletière is a commune in the Seine-Maritime department in the Normandy region in northern France.

Geography

Population

Places of interest
 The church of St. Germain, dating from the thirteenth century, with a chapel.

See also
Communes of the Seine-Maritime department

References

External links

 Carville-la-Folletière church web page 

Communes of Seine-Maritime